The Massachusetts Bar Association (MBA) is a voluntary, non-profit bar association in Massachusetts with a headquarters on West Street in Boston's Downtown Crossing. The MBA also has a Western Massachusetts office.

The purpose of the MBA is to serve the legal profession and the public by promoting the administration of justice, legal education, professional excellence and respect for the law. The MBA represents a diverse group of attorneys, judges and legal professionals across the commonwealth.

History
After the Massachusetts Bar Association has been organized in 1909 as a voluntary Association it was incorporated in 1911.

Of its members in 1911, historian Lee M. Friedman (1871–1957).

In 1951, the Law Society of Massachusetts merged with the Massachusetts Bar Association.

Membership 

Any member of the Bar of the Commonwealth of Massachusetts in good standing may become a member of the Association. Only members may vote and hold office in the Association.

Membership dues vary depending on how long an attorney has practiced, with special consideration given to particular areas of law, including legal services attorneys.

Any member of the MBA who has been admitted to the bar for 50 years, and is a current member in good standing shall automatically become a life member of the MBA and be exempt from paying annual dues.

Notable presidents
Nathan P. Avery, Holyoke (1932–1936)

See also
Law Society of Massachusetts

References

External links
Official website

Massachusetts
Bar
Bar
Non-profit organizations based in Boston
1910 establishments in Massachusetts
Organizations established in 1910